HMS Mounsey was a Yarrow M-class destroyer of the British Royal Navy. Built by the Scottish shipbuilder Yarrow in 1914–1915, Mounsey served in the Grand Fleet during the First World War, and took part in the Battle of Jutland. The following year she saw combat against German submarines, and in 1918 she helped rescue crew and passengers aboard the damaged troopship Otranto. She was sold for scrap in 1921.

Design and construction
The M-class destroyers were designed to meet a requirement for faster destroyers than the previous Laforey-class , in order to match reported German ships. As part of its 1913–1914 shipbuilding programme, the Admiralty ordered six ships to the standard Admiralty design, together with seven builder's specials from the experienced destroyer builders Yarrow, Thornycroft and Hawthorn Leslie, to the builder's own designs. The outbreak of the First World War resulted in a series of large orders being placed for destroyers to replace expected losses, with the existing M-class being chosen for orders rather than new designs to speed production. Twenty M-class destroyers were ordered in September 1914 as part of the First Emergency War Programme, with the order consisting of 16 Admiralty M-class ships and four Yarrow specials.

Three Yarrow water-tube boilers fed steam to Brown-Curtis impulse steam turbines, driving two propeller shafts. Two funnels were fitted, a distinguishing feature of the Yarrow specials.

The ships were armed with three 4-inch (102 mm) QF Mk 4 guns, together with two 2-pounder pom-pom anti-aircraft autocannons. Two twin 21-inch (533mm torpedo tubes were fitted. The ships had a crew of 80.

Mounsey, named for Captain William Mounsey, was laid down at Yarrow's Scotstoun shipyard on 18 October 1914 and launched on 11 September 1915.

Service
By January 1916, Mounsey had joined the 11th Destroyer Flotilla, part of the Grand Fleet. On 18 March 1916, the sighting of a submarine off the entrance to Lough Swilly in the north of Ireland led to a suspension of all sea traffic through the North Channel. Mounsey and sister ship , which had just finished refitting on the Clyde, were briefly stopped from returning to their base at Scapa Flow until orders were clarified.

Mounsey took part in the Battle of Jutland, departing from Cromarty on 30 May with most of the rest of the 11th Flotilla in support of the 2nd Battle Squadron. The 11th Flotilla clashed several times with German forces during the night of 31 May/1 June, with Mounsey  undamaged. Mounsey, together with the destroyer , was detached from the Fleet on the afternoon of 1 June to escort the battleship  to Rosyth.

Mounsey was ordered to lead five more destroyers to patrol off the north of Scotland to intercept UC-30 early on 14 April, and later that day sighted a submarine that dived away to safety (which was probably the British submarine , also searching for UC-30). While UC-30 evaded the searching British forces, the submarine never returned home, possibly sunk by a mine. On 24 June 1917, Mounsey and the destroyer  were escorting an east-bound convoy on the Scandinavian (Lerwick–Norway) route, when the convoy came under attack by the German submarine , which fired two torpedoes from distance at the convoy, one of which hit and sank the Swedish merchant ship . In response, Opal followed back the track of the torpedo and dropped a depth charge on the estimated location of the submarine, but U-67 escaped unharmed. Mounsey made for the submarine, which dived away, but later that day the submarine  torpedoed and sank the Norwegian  from the convoy.

Mounsey remained part of the 11th Flotilla in March 1918, but in April that year transferred to the 3rd Destroyer Flotilla, still attached to the Grand Fleet. In May 1918, Monsey moved again, this time to the 2nd Destroyer Flotilla, assigned to the Coast of Ireland Station and based at Buncrana in the north of Ireland.

On 6 October 1918, the troopship , part of a convoy carrying American troops to Europe, collided with the liner  in heavy seas in the North Channel. Otranto was badly damaged and was soon forced to stop by flooding, and had drifted close to the coast of Islay by the time that Mounsey arrived in response to Otrantos distress signal. Mounsey was unable to come alongside Otranto to take off Otrantos crew and passengers owing to the very heavy seas, and instead, her commanding officer, Lieutenant Francis Craven, took the destroyer as close as possible on Otrantos lee side so that men could jump over to Mounsey. Craven took Mounsey alongside Otranto four times in total, rescuing 596 of Otrantos passengers and crew before, with no more room for any more survivors and damaged by impacts with the side of the troopship, was forced to break off the rescue attempts and make for port. Otranto ran aground on Islay about 30 minutes after Mounsey left, killing 431. Craven was awarded the Distinguished Service Order for Mounseys rescue efforts.

Disposal
Mounsey was paid off by December 1918, and had moved to Devonport by February 1919. Mounsey was sold for scrap to Slough Trading Company on 8 November 1921 and broken up in Germany.

Pennant numbers

Notes

Citations

Bibliography
 
 
 
 
 
 
 
 
 
 
 
 

M-class destroyers (1913)
1915 ships
Ships built on the River Clyde